Rossignon may refer to:

Christophe Rossignon, French producer, actor
Georges Rossignon (1900-1974), French boxer
Jules Rossignon (died 1883), French professor, writer, scientific agriculturist, international coffee grower